Saul: The Journey to Damascus is a 2014 biblical drama film about Saul of Tarsus, directed by Mario Azzopardi, starring Kyle Schmid as the title character. It also stars Emmanuelle Vaugier and John Rhys-Davies. The film was released direct-to-video in Canada in April 2014.

Premise 
Saul of Tarsus persecutes those who spread the teachings of Jesus, and witnesses the stoning of Stephen. However, he reevaluates his beliefs, converting to Christianity and being baptized as Paul.

Cast
Kyle Schmid as Saul
Emmanuelle Vaugier as Mary Magdalene
John Rhys-Davies as Caiphas
Dan Cade as Stephen
Brittany Bristow as Johanna
Kris Holden-Ried as Jordan
Callum Blue as Addai
Leif Bristow as Marcus Quintas
Brent Crawford as Ananias
Larissa Bonaci as Ester
Malcolm Ellul as Sahedrin Sergeant
Mikhail Basmadjian as Follower
Paul Portelli as Lieutenant
Marc Cabourdin as Flavius
Sean Buhagiar as Luke
Andrew Mallia as St. Peter's Son
Daniel Pace Bonello as Sahedrin Guard

Production
The film is a Canadian-Maltese co-production, with location shooting taking place in Malta.

References

External links

2014 films
Cultural depictions of Paul the Apostle
Portrayals of Mary Magdalene in film
2014 drama films
English-language Canadian films
Canadian drama films
Maltese drama films
Films shot in Malta
Films based on the Gospels
Films set in the 1st century
Films set in the Roman Empire
Films about Christianity
2010s English-language films
Films directed by Mario Philip Azzopardi
2010s Canadian films